Sommai Phasee (born 26 June 1944) is a Thai banker and financial executive. He served as Minister of Finance in the first cabinet of Prime Minister Prayut Chan-o-cha from 2014 to 2015.

References 

Sommai Phasee
Sommai Phasee
Sommai Phasee
Living people
1944 births
Place of birth missing (living people)
Sommai Phasee